Joseph Rowan (September 8, 1870 – August 3, 1930) was an American lawyer, banker, and politician who served one term as a U.S. Representative from New York from 1919 to 1921.

Biography
Joseph Charles Rowan was born in New York City on September 8, 1870.  He attended the public schools and graduated from Columbia Law School in 1891. He was admitted to the bar in 1892 and practiced in New York City.

He was also involved in banking and other businesses, including serving as a trustee of the West Side Savings Bank.  In 1905, Rowan married Cora Cook, the daughter of Dr. Stephen Cook, the chief surgeon of the New York City Police Department.

Congress 
A Democrat allied with Tammany Hall, in 1918, Rowan ran successfully for a seat in the U.S. House, defeating incumbent Walter M. Chandler.  He served in the 66th United States Congress, March 4, 1919 – March 4, 1921. He was not a candidate for renomination in 1920, and resumed the practice of law.

Death and burial 
He died in New York City on August 3, 1930. Rowan was interred in Woodlawn Cemetery.

References

External links

1870 births
1930 deaths
Politicians from New York City
New York (state) lawyers
Columbia Law School alumni
Burials at Woodlawn Cemetery (Bronx, New York)
Democratic Party members of the United States House of Representatives from New York (state)